Several vessels have been named Flinders after British explorer Matthew Flinders (1774–1814), including:

 Flinders was a schooner owned by the South Australian Colonial Government between 1865 and 1873.
  was a passenger-cargo steamer of  built by A & J Inglis Ltd, Pointhouse, Glasgow for the Tasmanian Steam Navigation Company, Hobart. She was later in the fleets of Union Steam Ship Company of New Zealand, McIlwraith, McEacharn & Co and Adelaide Steamship Company, and then hulked in 1911 after being damaged by fire.
  was a Royal Navy survey ship, completed in 1919 by Lobnitz & Co, Renfrew.  She was laid down as the Aberdare-class minesweeper Radley but repurposed during construction. Flinders became an accommodation ship in 1940, then was a blockship at Poole from 1942. She was broken up at Falmouth in 1945.
  was a hydrographic survey ship in service from 1973 to 1998.
  is the intended name of a  that is expected to enter service in the late-2020s.

Citations

Ship names